Grant Hollow is a hamlet in Rensselaer County, in the U.S. state of New York. 

The community took its name from the Grant-Ferris Company, manufacturers of agricultural equipment. The name is sometimes spelled with the apostrophe, "Grant's Hollow".

References

Hamlets in Rensselaer County, New York